The Wildorado Wind Ranch, completed in 2007, is located on approximately   west of  Amarillo, Texas, and consists of 161 MW of wind turbines (70 Siemens Mk II turbines each capable of generating 2.3 MW at peak wind speeds). These turbines have the capacity to meet the electricity demand of more than 50,000 households. The Wildorado Wind Ranch was developed by Cielo Wind Power, of Austin, Texas, in conjunction with Edison Mission Group of Irvine, California, Epplament Energy and Lestis Private Capital Group.

References

Energy infrastructure completed in 2007
Buildings and structures in Oldham County, Texas
Buildings and structures in Potter County, Texas
Buildings and structures in Randall County, Texas
Wind farms in Texas